The Chitlin' Circuit was a collection of performance venues throughout the eastern, southern, and upper Midwest areas of the United States that provided commercial and cultural acceptance for African American musicians, comedians, and other entertainers during the era of racial segregation in the United States through the 1960s.

The Chitlin' Circuit was considered to be by, for, and about black people. There is debate as to when the Chitlin' Circuit peaked.  Some say its peak was in the 1930s, some say it was after World War II, and others say it was the time of the blues.

Etymology 
The name derives from the soul food dish chitterlings (boiled pig intestines). It is also a play on the term "Borscht Belt", which referred to particular resort venues (primarily in New York State's Catskill Mountains) that were popular with Jewish performers and audiences during the 1940s through the 1960s. Chitterlings are part of the culinary history of African Americans, who were often limited to the intestines of the pig to eat as opposed to the bacon or ham. The food symbolizes acquiring a taste out of necessity and eventually coming to like it.

The term "Chitlin' Circuit" did not appear in print until a 1972 article on Ike & Tina Turner in The Chicago Defender. However, the slang term "Chitlin'" was used long before it was printed. Blues musician W.C. Handy wrote of chitlin' cafes in his 1917 song "Beale Street Blues". In the 21st century, the term is applied to the venues, especially in the South, where contemporary African-American blues singers such as Bobby Rush, Denise LaSalle, and O.B. Buchana continue to appear regularly.

Contemporary use 
Ebony magazine prefers the term "urban theater circuit" for recent work like that of playwright and actor Tyler Perry. In a January 2004 interview with Perry, the genre's leading practitioner, Ebony wrote that his work marked "a new chapter in the urban theater circuit as a whole—a genre that has been dogged by criticism from some Blacks in the traditional theater. Perry, as the most visibly recognized player in the circuit, has felt the brunt of this criticism." "They say that Tyler Perry has set the Black race back some 500 years with these types of "Chitlin' Circuit" shows. The problem with the naysayers is that they don't take the opportunity to see my shows,' Perry argued. "With my shows, I try to build a bridge that marries what's deemed 'legitimate theater' and so-called 'chitlin' circuit theater,' and I think I've done pretty well with that, in bringing people in to enjoy a more elevated level of theater.'"

Origins
Leading figures in establishing the Chitlin' Circuit were the Black Indianapolis entrepreneurs Sea and Denver D. Ferguson.  After the collapse of the Theatre Owners Booking Association (TOBA) in 1930, the Ferguson brothers drew on bandleader and influential columnist Walter Barnes and his contacts to bring top Black entertainers to Indianapolis in the 1930s.  When their businesses' licenses were revoked in 1940, they opened Ferguson Brothers, a booking agency, which grew rapidly and became the most powerful Black-owned talent agency in the country.  They helped various orchestras, bands, and vaudeville shows book gigs, including Jay McShann, King Kolax, Tiny Bradshaw, Roosevelt Sykes, Claude Trenier, the Bama State Collegians, Carolina Cotton Pickers, Snookum Russell, Milton Larkin, Clarence Love, Gene Pope, and the International Sweethearts of Rhythm, and organised tours around the South playing to Black audiences. Musician Sax Kari described Denver Ferguson as "the man who invented the chitlin’ circuit".

Theaters and nightclubs
Noted theaters and nightclubs on the Chitlin' Circuit included:
 Atlanta, Georgia: The Royal Peacock, originally The Top Hat
 Austin, Texas: The Victory Grill
 Baltimore, Maryland: The Royal Theatre 
 Bay St. Louis, Mississippi: The 100 Men Hall
 Birmingham, Alabama: The Carver Theatre  
 Bowling Green, Kentucky: The Quanset 
 Chicago, Illinois: Robert's Show Lounge, Club DeLisa, and the Regal Theatre 
 Detroit, Michigan: The Fox Theatre 
 Eatonville, Florida: Club Eaton
 Gaithersburg, Maryland: The Du-Drop Inn, Emory Grove 
 Harlem, New York: Cotton Club, Smalls Paradise, and the Apollo Theater 
 Hobson City, Alabama: The Men's Club, Holloway's Night Club
 Indianapolis, Indiana: The Madam C. J. Walker Theatre 
 Jacksonville, Florida: The Ritz Theatre 
 Lebanon, Kentucky: Club Cherry
 Lexington, Kentucky: The Lyric Theatre 
 Little Rock, Arkansas:  Dreamland Ballroom
Memphis, Tennessee: Club Handy, Club Paradise
Norfolk, Virginia: Attucks Theatre "The Apollo of the South"
 Mobile (Prichard), Alabama: The Harlem Duke Social Club 
 Pensacola, Florida: Abe's 506 Club
 Philadelphia, Pennsylvania: Uptown Theatre 
 Pittsburgh, Pennsylvania: New Granada
 Richmond, Virginia: The Hippodrome Theatre 
 San Antonio, Texas: Eastwood Country Club
San Antonio, Texas: Keyhole Club (1619 West Poplar)
 Smithville, Texas: West End Park
 St. Petersburg, Florida: The Manhattan Casino 
 Taylor, Texas: Chicken Shack,Hidalgo Park & One Acre Club
 Tampa, Florida: The Blue Note
 Tallahassee, Florida: The Red Bird Café
 Tulsa, Oklahoma: The Big 10 Ballroom
 Waco, Texas: Walker's Auditorium
 Washington, D.C.: Howard Theatre 
Seasonal venues included the still-standing auditorium at John Brown's Farm (also known as "the Kennedy Farm") outside Sharpsburg, Maryland; Carr's and Sparrow's Beach in Anne Arundel County, Maryland; and Rosedale Beach in Millsboro, Delaware.

According to Ruth Brown, an artist needed to play at four specific theaters to prove they had made it: the Regal in Chicago, the Howard in Washington D.C., the Uptown in Philadelphia, and the Apollo in New York City. This was called the "litchman chain".

The song "Tuxedo Junction" was written about a stop along the Chitlin' Circuit in Birmingham. Once the performance was over, the band would leave for the next stop on the circuit. After composing the music, Erskine Hawkins explained the reason for the title to Buddy Feyne, who created lyrics to express the concept.

Notable performers 
Notable 20th-century performers  who worked on the Chitlin' Circuit included:

 Count Basie
 Peg Leg Bates
 Tiny Bradshaw 
 James Brown & The Famous Flames
 Cab Calloway
 Ray Charles
 Louis Jordan
 Lucky Millinder
 Dorothy Dandridge
 Sammy Davis, Jr.
 Fats Domino
 Duke Ellington
 Ella Fitzgerald
 Little Milton
 Redd Foxx
 Aretha Franklin
 Billie Holiday
 John Lee Hooker
 Roy Hamilton
 Lena Horne
 Sam Cooke
 Jackie Wilson
 Teddy Wilson
 Etta James
 Albert King
 B.B. King
 Freddy King

 Muddy Waters
 Howlin' Wolf
 Bobby "Blue" Bland
 Tyrone Davis
 Willie Hightower
 Joe Tex 
 Moms Mabley
 Jay McShann
 Rudy Ray Moore
 Roosevelt Sykes
 The Dramatics
 Soul Children
 Wilson Pickett
 Richard Pryor
 Otis Redding
 Little Richard
 Ike & Tina Turner
 The Miracles
 The Jackson 5 
 Gladys Knight & the Pips
 The Four Tops 
 The Temptations
 The Isley Brothers 
 Marvin Gaye & Tammi Terrell
 Johnnie Taylor
 Bobby Rush
 Flip Wilson

Mississippi Blues Trail marker
A historic marker designated by the Mississippi Blues Commission on the Mississippi Blues Trail was placed in front of the 100 Men Hall in Bay St. Louis, Mississippi. The 100 Men Hall is one of the rare still standing, still active blues venues on the trail. The second historic marker designated by the Mississippi Blues Commission on the Mississippi Blues Trail was placed in front of the Southern Whispers Restaurant on Nelson Street in Greenville, Mississippi, a stop on the Chitlin' Circuit in the early days of the blues. The marker commemorates the importance of this site in the history of the blues in Mississippi. In the 1940s and 1950s, this historic strip drew crowds to the flourishing club scene to hear Delta blues, big band, jump blues, and jazz.

Musical references
 1976: The Kudzu Band – Chitlin' Circuit
 1995: Wentus Blues Band – Chitlin' Circuit
 2005: North Carolina hip-hop group Little Brother named their mixtape Chittlin Circuit 1.5
 2019: The song "Tyler Perry Writes Real Life" from the musical A Strange Loop by Michael R. Jackson

See also
Borscht Belt
Denver D. Ferguson
Imperial Hotel (Thomasville, Georgia)
The Negro Motorist Green Book
Sawdust trail
Theatre Owners Booking Association

References

Further reading
 Lauterbach, Preston. The Chitlin' Circuit: And the Road to Rock 'N' Roll. New York: W. W. Norton, 2011. 
 Preston Lauterbach, "Chitlin' Circuit", Memphis Magazine, July 1, 2006
John M. Brewer, Jr, Pittsburgh Jazz, part of the Images of America: Pennsylvania series

External links
 Jimi Hendrix and the Chitlin' Circuit
 Flickr Photo Set: Historic Chitlin' Circuit Clubs

African-American cultural history
Vaudeville theaters
Historically African-American theaters and music venues
Mississippi Blues Trail